Geml or GEML may refer to:

Great Eastern Main Line, a major English rail line
General Enterprise Modelling Language, a component of Generalised Enterprise Reference Architecture and Methodology
, mayor of Timișoara, Hungary from 1914 to 1919
 József Geml, Hungarian mycologist and editor of Persoonia
Melilla Airport (ICAO: GEML), an airport in the namesake Spanish enclave in Africa